Yubileyny is a rural locality (a settlement) and the administrative centre of Yubileynoye Rural Settlement, Barguzinsky District, Republic of Buryatia, Russia. The population was 765 as of 2017. There are 6 streets.

Geography 
Yubileyny is located 60 km northeast of Barguzin (the district's administrative centre) by road. Bayangol is the nearest rural locality.

References 

Rural localities in Barguzinsky District